Teresita Joy De Leon-Viado (April 10, 1959 – September 10, 2016) was a Filipino character actress, singer, and comedian known for playing Lola Paula in Luv U, Bebot in Kokey @ Ako, and Aling Gloria in Cinco.

Early life
Viado was raised in Pasig. She began her career as part of the children's show Eskwelahang Munti, not until she won the grand prize in the Fe S. Panlilio Scholarship singing contest in 1994, signifying her start of her singing career. In mid 1990s, she became part of the hit children's show Ang TV. In 2000, she appeared and hosted IBC-13's noontime variety show, Lunch Break.

She acted in theater plays, horror, drama, romance and comedy films. She also appeared in several television shows, particularly from ABS-CBN.

Filmography

Film

Television

Death
Viado died on September 10, 2016, at Quezon City General Hospital following a heart attack. She was diagnosed with diabetes for almost three decades, and underwent four debridement surgeries to remove the wounds that she is suffering on her legs due to diabetes complications and to save her from possible amputation.

References

External links
 

1959 births
2016 deaths
People from Manila
Filipino television actresses
Filipino television personalities
Filipino film actresses
Filipino women comedians
Deaths from diabetes
20th-century Filipino actresses
21st-century Filipino actresses
ABS-CBN personalities
GMA Network personalities
TV5 (Philippine TV network) personalities